South Hetton railway station served the village of South Hetton, County Durham, England, from 1858 to 1952 on the Durham and Sunderland Railway.

History 
The station opened in 1858 on the North Eastern Railway. It was situated on the south side of Front Street on the A182. It closed on 9 June 1952. The site is now a footpath.

References

External links 

Disused railway stations in County Durham
Railway stations in Great Britain opened in 1858
Railway stations in Great Britain closed in 1952
1858 establishments in England
1952 disestablishments in England
South Hetton